Thomas James DePaso (born February 22, 1956) is a former American football linebacker in the National Football League (NFL) who played for the Cincinnati Bengals. He played college football at Penn State University.

References 

1956 births
Living people
People from White Plains, New York
Players of American football from New York (state)
American football linebackers
Penn State Nittany Lions football players
Cincinnati Bengals players